Jean-Baptiste François Desoria (1758 – 1832), was a French painter.

Biography
He was born in Paris and trained with Jean Bernard Restout. He painted in the neoclassical style and became the teacher of Auguste Dominique Mennessier.

He died in Cambrai.

References

Jean-Baptiste François Desoria on Artnet

1758 births
1832 deaths
18th-century French painters
French male painters
Painters from Paris
19th-century French painters
19th-century French male artists
18th-century French male artists